Siriraj Hospital is the oldest and largest hospital in Thailand. It is in Bangkok on the west bank of the Chao Phraya River, opposite Thammasat University's Tha Phrachan campus. It is the primary teaching hospital of the Faculty of Medicine Siriraj Hospital, Mahidol University.

Description
With a capacity of more than 2,000 beds and visited by more than three million patients per year Siriraj is one of the largest and busiest medical centers in Southeast Asia. The medical school accepts about 250 medical students and more than 100 for postgraduate residency training each year.  Siriraj is the largest public hospital in Thailand. The hospital is generally regarded as one of the final referral centers for complicated and rare diseases from all hospitals in Thailand.

The logo of the Siriraj Hospital is the Naga curled into a shape of "ศ" (pronounce as "Sor-Sala"), the first Thai alphabet of the hospital name with the Royal Diadem on top of the Naga.

History

The hospital was founded by King Chulalongkorn in 1888, two years after a worldwide cholera outbreak. It is named after the king's 18-month-old son, Prince Siriraj Kakudhabhand, who had died from dysentery a year before the opening of the hospital. The medical school was established two years later in 1890.

Prince Dipangkorn Rasmijoti was also born here.

Siriraj was the residence of the late King of Thailand, Bhumibol Adulyadej, from September 2009 to August 2013. He entered the hospital for treatment of a respiratory condition. In October 2014 King Bhumibol had gall bladder surgery at Siriraj. He died there on 13 October 2016.

Museums

There are seven medical museums at Siriraj Hospital. They are the Siriraj Bimuksthan Museum, Ellis Pathological Museum, Congdons Anatomical Museum, Songkran Niyomsan Forensic Medicine Museum, Parasitological Museum, Touch Museum in Honor of Queen Mother Sirikit, and Sood Sangvichien Prehistoric Museum Laboratory. The permanent exhibits include sections on anatomy, pathology, congenital disorders, toxicology, techniques of Thai traditional medicine, and forensic pathology.

In 2008, the temporary exhibit featured the role of Siriraj Hospital. The latest museum is Siriraj Bimuksthan Museum, opened in early 2013. The museum is housed in the renovated vintage architecture of the old Bangkok Noi railway station, next to Siriraj's newly opened private subsidiary Siriraj Piyamaharajkarun Hospital. The museum exhibits history of medicine in Thailand from traditional medicine to modern, and includes history of the Bangkok Noi area where the museum and the hospital are situated.

See also
 Siriraj Piyamaharajkarun Hospital
 Health in Thailand
 Hospitals in Thailand
 List of hospitals in Thailand
 List of hospitals in Bangkok

References

External links

Faculty of Medicine Siriraj Hospital, Mahidol University Website
Ramathibodi Hospital Faculty of Medicine, the younger sister medical school of Mahidol University

Mahidol University
Hospitals in Bangkok
Teaching hospitals in Thailand
Hospitals established in 1888
Bangkok Noi district
Hospitals in Thailand
Buildings and structures on the Chao Phraya River

de:Siriraj Medizinische Fakultät und Krankenhaus, Mahidol Universität